Johan Adriaan, Baron van der Heim van Duivendijke (15 January 1791 – 14 October 1870) was a Dutch politician. He served as Minister of Finance in 1843, and as Minister of the Interior in 1848.

See also
List of Dutch politicians

References

1791 births
1870 deaths
King's and Queen's Commissioners of South Holland
Ministers of Finance of the Netherlands
Ministers of the Interior of the Netherlands
Members of the Senate (Netherlands)
Lawyers from Rotterdam
Barons of the Netherlands
Politicians from Rotterdam
Commanders of the Order of the Netherlands Lion